The 2021 Australian Open described in detail, in the form of day-by-day summaries.

All dates are AEDT (UTC+11)

Day 1 (8 February)
 Seeds out:
 Men's Singles:  Gaël Monfils [10],  Benoît Paire [25]
 Women's Singles:  Angelique Kerber [23],  Alison Riske [24],  Wang Qiang [30]
 Schedule of Play

Day 2 (9 February)
 Seeds out:
 Men's Singles:  Roberto Bautista Agut [12],  David Goffin [13],  Hubert Hurkacz [26],  Dan Evans [30]
 Women's Singles:  Victoria Azarenka [12],  Johanna Konta [13],  Petra Martić [16],  Maria Sakkari [20],  Zhang Shuai [31]
 Schedule of Play

Day 3 (10 February)
 Seeds out:
 Men's Singles:  Stan Wawrinka [17],  Ugo Humbert [29]
 Women's Singles:  Bianca Andreescu [8],  Petra Kvitová [9],  Elena Rybakina [17]
 Men's Doubles:  Henri Kontinen /  Édouard Roger-Vasselin [11]
 Women's Doubles:  Duan Yingying /  Zheng Saisai [8],  Samantha Stosur /  Zhang Shuai [10]
 Schedule of Play

Day 4 (11 February)
 Seeds out:
 Men's Singles:  Borna Ćorić [22],  Lorenzo Sonego [31]
 Women's Singles:  Sofia Kenin [4]
 Men's Doubles:  Marcel Granollers /  Horacio Zeballos [3],  Jérémy Chardy /  Fabrice Martin [12],  Oliver Marach /  Robin Haase [13],  Sander Gillé /  Joran Vliegen [14]
 Women's Doubles:  Chan Hao-ching /  Latisha Chan [5],  Veronika Kudermetova /  Anna Blinkova [15]
 Schedule of Play

Day 5 (12 February)
 Seeds out:
 Men's Singles:  Diego Schwartzman [8],  Denis Shapovalov [11],  Pablo Carreño Busta [15],  Taylor Fritz [27],  Adrian Mannarino [32]
 Women's Singles:  Ons Jabeur [27],  Veronika Kudermetova [32]
 Men's Doubles:  Max Purcell /  Luke Saville [15]
 Women's Doubles:  Gabriela Dabrowski /  Bethanie Mattek-Sands [6],  Xu Yifan /  Yang Zhaoxuan [11]
 Mixed Doubles:  Chan Hao-ching /  Juan Sebastián Cabal [4],   Demi Schuurs /  Wesley Koolhof [5],   Latisha Chan /  Ivan Dodig [7]
 Schedule of Play

Day 6 (13 February)
 Seeds out:
 Men's Singles:  Karen Khachanov [19],  Alex de Minaur [21],  Filip Krajinović [28]
 Women's Singles:  Karolína Plíšková [6],  Belinda Bencic [11],  Anett Kontaveit [21],  Yulia Putintseva [26],  Ekaterina Alexandrova [29]
 Men's Doubles:  Juan Sebastián Cabal /  Robert Farah [1],  Ken Skupski /  Neal Skupski [16]
 Women's Doubles:  Hsieh Su-wei /  Barbora Strýcová [1],  Kirsten Flipkens /  Andreja Klepač [14]
 Schedule of Play

Day 7 (14 February)
 Seeds out:
 Men's Singles:  Dominic Thiem [3],  Milos Raonic [14],  Félix Auger-Aliassime [20],  Dušan Lajović [23]
 Women's Singles:  Aryna Sabalenka [7],  Garbiñe Muguruza [14],  Iga Świątek [15],  Markéta Vondroušová [19]
 Women's Doubles:  Hayley Carter /  Luisa Stefani [12],  Laura Siegemund /  Vera Zvonareva [16]
 Mixed Doubles:  Barbora Strýcová /  Nikola Mektić [1]
 Schedule of Play

Day 8 (15 February)
 Seeds out:
 Men's Singles:  Matteo Berrettini [9],  Fabio Fognini [16],  Casper Ruud [24]
 Women's Singles:  Elina Svitolina [5],  Elise Mertens [18],  Donna Vekić [28]
 Men's Doubles:  Wesley Koolhof /  Łukasz Kubot [4],  Marcelo Melo /  Horia Tecău [7],  John Peers /  Michael Venus [10]
 Women's Doubles:  Alexa Guarachi /  Desirae Krawczyk [9],  Lyudmyla Kichenok /  Jeļena Ostapenko [13]
 Mixed Doubles:  Nicole Melichar /  Robert Farah [2]
 Schedule of Play

Day 9 (16 February)
 Seeds out:
 Men's Singles:  Alexander Zverev [6],  Grigor Dimitrov [18]
 Women's Singles:  Simona Halep [2] 
 Men's Doubles:  Pierre-Hugues Herbert /  Nicolas Mahut [8]
 Women's Doubles:  Shuko Aoyama /  Ena Shibahara [7]
 Mixed Doubles:  Luisa Stefani /  Bruno Soares [8]
 Schedule of Play

Day 10 (17 February)
 Seeds out:
 Men's Singles:  Rafael Nadal [2],  Andrey Rublev [7]
 Women's Singles:  Ashleigh Barty [1]
 Women's Doubles:  Nicole Melichar /  Demi Schuurs [4]
 Mixed Doubles:  Gabriela Dabrowski /  Mate Pavić [3]
 Schedule of Play

Day 11 (18 February)
 Seeds out:
 Women's Singles:  Serena Williams [10],  Karolína Muchová [25]
 Men's Doubles:  Nikola Mektić /  Mate Pavić [2]
 Schedule of Play

Day 12 (19 February)
 Seeds out:
 Men's Singles:  Stefanos Tsitsipas [5]
 Men's Doubles:  Jamie Murray /  Bruno Soares [6]
 Women's Doubles:  Barbora Krejčíková /  Kateřina Siniaková [3]
 Schedule of Play

Day 13 (20 February)
 Seeds out:
 Women's Singles:  Jennifer Brady [22]
 Schedule of Play

Day 14 (21 February)
 Seeds out:
 Men's Singles:  Daniil Medvedev [4]
 Men's Doubles:  Rajeev Ram /  Joe Salisbury [5]
 Schedule of Play

Notes

Day-by-day summaries
Australian Open (tennis) by year – Day-by-day summaries